Jef Delen (born 29 June 1976 in Bonheiden) is a former Belgian professional football player. He usually plays as left winger.

Delen had been captain of Westerlo since the 2006-07 season.
He is generally nicknamed "the Flemish Ryan Giggs".

Honours
Westerlo
Belgian Cup: 2000-01

References

External links
 Jef Delen player info at Sporza.be 
 Player info at the official VC Westerlo website 

1976 births
Living people
Belgian footballers
Association football wingers
K.V. Mechelen players
K.V.C. Westerlo players
Challenger Pro League players
Belgian Pro League players
People from Bonheiden
Footballers from Antwerp Province